Monte Spina is a mountain of Lombardy, Italy. It is 962 metres above sea level.

Mountains of the Alps
Mountains of Lombardy